Inside Out is the third album by The Flock. It was released in 1975.

Track listing
Side 1
"Music for Our Friends" - 4:26 (James Hirsen)
"Back to You" - 8:06 (Hirsen)
"Metamorphosis" - 5:37 (Hirsen, Fred Glickstein, Jerry Smith, Mike Zydowsky, Ron Karpman)
Side 2
"Hang On" - 3:15 (Glickstein, Smith, Karpman)
"My OK Today" - 7:23 (Glickstein, Smith, Karpman)
"Straight Home" - 6:00 (Hirsen, Karpman)

Personnel 
Fred Glickstein - guitar, lead vocals
James L. Hirsen - keyboards, backing and lead vocals
Mike Zydowsky - violin
Jerry Smith - bass, backing vocals
Ron Karpman - drums, backing vocals
Felix Pappalardi - backing vocals (6)

References

1975 albums
The Flock (band) albums
Albums produced by Felix Pappalardi
Mercury Records albums